The Galapagos barnacle blenny (Acanthemblemaria castor) is a species of chaenopsid blenny endemic to coral reefs in the Galapagos Islands, in the southeast Pacific ocean. It can reach a maximum length of  TL. The specific name honours a naturalist at the Charles Darwin Foundation, Academy Bay, Santa Cruz Island, Galápagos, Miguel Castro.

References

External links

 Stephens, J. S. Jr., E. S. Hobson, and R. K. Johnson 1966 (7 Sept.) [ref. 9071] Notes on distribution, behaviour, and morphological variation in some chaenopsid fishes from the tropical eastern Pacific, with descriptions of two new species, Acanthemblemaria castroi and Coralliozetus springeri. Copeia 1966 (no. 3): 424–438.
 

castroi
Endemic fauna of the Galápagos Islands
Galápagos Islands coastal fauna
Galapagos barnacle blenny